Lukas Graham (also known as Blue Album) is the second studio album by Danish band Lukas Graham. It was released in Denmark on 16 June 2015 through Copenhagen Records. The album includes the singles "Mama Said", "Strip No More" and "7 Years". A version of the album incorporating "Drunk in the Morning" and "Better Than Yourself (Criminal Mind Pt 2)" from the band's debut (while removing "Hayo", the interlude and "Playtime") was released internationally on 1 April 2016, serving as the band's debut album in the United States and United Kingdom.

Artwork 
The original Danish cover of the album takes its artwork from The Lady with the Bottles, a 1992 painting by Danish artist Lars Helweg that is based on a nude picture of the Swedish actress Anita Ekberg that appeared in the magazine Playboy during the 1950s. The American cover was designed to be less risqué; it shows a boy looking at Helweg's painting, with his arm bent in a way that covers up the woman's breasts.

Reception

Critical reception

Lukas Graham received mostly favourable reviews from critics. At Metacritic, which assigns a normalized rating out of 100 to reviews from mainstream publications, it received an average score of 75, based on 5 reviews.

Commercial performance
In Denmark, Lukas Graham was released on 16 June 2015 without any promotion. The album entered the Danish Albums Chart at number one and spent 22 non-consecutive weeks at the top of the chart. It has spent 163 weeks on the whole chart, including 95 weeks in the top 10, with the last one being in its 163rd charting week.
In the United Kingdom, the album debuted at number two on the UK Albums Chart, with first-week sales of 24,093 copies, becoming the highest-charting album by a Danish act. 
Lukas Graham debuted at number one on the Australian Albums Chart, becoming the first number-one album by a Danish act since Aqua's Aquarium peaked at number one in 1998.

The album debuted at number three on the Billboard 200 in the United States, selling 34,000 copies. It is the highest-charting album by a Danish act. Danish singer Coco O previously charted at number two with the soundtrack to The Great Gatsby (2013).

In Canada, the album debuted at number one on the Canadian Albums Chart, selling 5,300 copies.

Track listing

Notes
  signifies an additional producer
  signifies a co-producer

Charts

Weekly charts

Year-end charts

Certifications

Release history

References

2015 albums
Lukas Graham albums
Warner Records albums